The 1927 Furman Purple Hurricane football team represented the Furman University as a member of the Southern Intercollegiate Athletic Association (SIAA) during the 1927 college football season. Led by 13th-year head coach Billy Laval, the Purple Hurricane compiled an overall record of 10–1 with a mark of 3–0 in conference play, sharing the SIAA title with Centenary, Chattanooga, and Mississippi College. Furman outscored its opponents 283 to 59.

Quarterback Whitey Rawl scored three touchdowns in the victory over SIAA co-champion NC State, and the game's only touchdown in the win over The Citadel. In the season's only loss, to the "Dream and Wonder" team of Georgia, Furman was twice within Georgia's 5-yard line.

Schedule

Players

Backfield

References

Furman
Furman Paladins football seasons
Furman Purple Hurricane football